Radhaswami (Sanskrit: "the swami of Radha") can refer to:
 Krishna
 Radhaswami (Buddhist sage), a Brahmin Buddhist sage, under whose guidance the Mauryan emperor Ashoka adopted Buddhism
 Radha Soami, a spiritual movement founded by Shiv Dayal Singh